Binance Holdings Ltd., branded Binance, is a global company that operates the largest cryptocurrency exchange in the world in terms of daily trading volume of cryptocurrencies. It was founded in 2017. 

Binance was founded by Changpeng Zhao, a developer who had previously created high frequency trading software. Binance was initially based in China, but later moved its headquarters out of China shortly before the Chinese government imposed regulations on cryptocurrency trading.

In 2021, Binance was put under investigation by both the United States Department of Justice and Internal Revenue Service on allegations of money laundering and tax offenses. The UK's Financial Conduct Authority ordered Binance to stop all regulated activity in the United Kingdom in June 2021.

In 2021, Binance shared client data, including names and addresses, with the Russian government.

History

2013–2017: company beginnings and move out of China
CEO Changpeng Zhao had previously founded Fusion Systems in 2005 in Shanghai; the company built high-frequency trading systems for stockbrokers. In 2013, he joined Blockchain.info as the third member of the cryptocurrency wallet's team. He also worked at OKCoin as CTO for less than a year, a platform for spot trading between fiat and digital assets.

The company was founded in 2017 in China but moved its servers and headquarters out of China and into Japan in advance of the Chinese government ban on cryptocurrency trading in September 2017.

2018–2019: launch of stable coin and security breach
In January 2018 it was the largest cryptocurrency exchange with a market capitalization of $1.3 billion, a title it had retained as late as April 2021, despite competition from Coinbase, among others.

In March 2018, Binance announced its intentions to open an office in Malta after stricter regulations in Japan and China. In April 2018, Binance signed a memorandum of understanding with the government of Bermuda. Months later, a similar memorandum was signed with the Malta Stock Exchange to develop a platform for trading security tokens. In 2019, company announced Binance Jersey, an independent entity from its parent Binance.com exchange, with the aim to expand its European influence. Jersey based exchange offers fiat-to-cryptocurrency pairs, including the Euro and the British pound.

In April 2018, Binance launched the Binance Charity Foundation. The charity's goal is to support the advancement of blockchain-enabled philanthropy with a focus on third-world countries.

In June 2018, Binance and three other firms raised $65 million for sports blockchain company Chiliz.

In July 2018, Binance acquired Trust Wallet, a decentralized cryptocurrency wallet for an undisclosed sum. Hovever, Binance, confirmed that the compensation is a mixture of cash, Binance stock, and a portion of its BNB token.

In August 2018, Binance along with three other big exchanges raised $32 million for a stablecoin project. The idea of stable coins is to provide a cryptocurrency without the notorious volatility of Bitcoin and other popular digital assets.

In January 2019, Binance announced that it had partnered with Israel-based payment processor Simplex to enable cryptocurrency purchases with debit and credit cards, including Visa and Mastercard. The purchases are subject to Simplex's local bank policies and are limited to Bitcoin, Ethereum, Litecoin and Ripple's XRP.

On 7 May 2019, Binance revealed that it had been the victim of a "large scale security breach" in which hackers had stolen 7,000 Bitcoin worth around $40 million at the time. Binance CEO Changpeng Zhao said the hackers "used a variety of techniques, including phishing, viruses and other attacks" and structured their transaction "in a way that passed our existing security checks." Binance halted further withdrawals and deposits but allowed trading to continue. The site pledged to reimburse customers through its "Secure Asset Fund for Users (SAFU)". Withdrawals resumed by 19 May.

In September 2019, the exchange began offering perpetual futures contracts, allowing leverage as high as 125 times the value of the contracts. In November 2019, Binance announced it was acquiring Indian bitcoin exchange WazirX, which became disputed in August 2022 when Binance founder Zhao claimed the deal was never signed.

2020–2022: acquisitions and investments
On 21 February 2020, the Malta Financial Services Authority (MFSA) issued a public statement responding to media reports referring to Binance as a 'Malta-based' cryptocurrency company. The statement noted that Binance "is not authorized by the MFSA to operate in the cryptocurrency sphere and is therefore not subject to regulatory oversight by the MFSA." The MFSA added that it was "assessing if Binance has any activities in Malta which may not fall within the realm of regulatory oversight."

In March 2020, Binance acquired CoinMarketCap. Although the price of the acquisition was not disclosed, it’s reported to be up to $400 million. CoinMarketCap was founded in 2013 and is one of the largest cryptocurrency online tracking tools.

In July 2020, Binance announced a "strategic partnership" with a Chinese state-owned enterprise under the State-owned Assets Supervision and Administration Commission of the State Council and that Binance had joined a group "aiming to facilitate" the Belt and Road Initiative.

On 28 October 2020, Forbes staff released leaked documents showing that Binance and Changpeng Zhao created an elaborate corporate structure designed to intentionally deceive United States regulators and secretly profit from cryptocurrency investors located in the country. Binance officially blocks access from IP addresses located in the United States, but "potential customers would be taught how to evade geographic restrictions", Forbes claimed.

In May 2021 it was reported that Binance was under investigation by both the Internal Revenue Service and the United States Department of Justice on allegations of money laundering and tax offenses.

In February 2022, Binance took a $200 million stake in Forbes.

In March 2022, amidst the 2022 Russian invasion of Ukraine, Binance's CEO Changpeng Zhao, refused to ban users from Russia, citing "financial freedom". Binance later softened the tone of their opposition but not their policy, and also pointed to their donation of $10 million for humanitarian needs in Ukraine.

In April 2022, Reuters reported that, in 2021, Binance shared information with Rosfinmonitoring about funds raised by jailed Russian opposition leader Alexei Navalny's network.

On 27 May 2022, Binance announced the registration of its legal entity in Italy, and has plans of opening offices and expanding the local team in the area. CEO Changpeng Zhao also shared information regarding Binance's registration with France's market regulator. The company is also seeking registration in more European countries, such as Switzerland, Sweden, Spain, Netherlands, Portugal and Austria.

On 13 June 2022 Binance announced that users would, for an unspecified period of time, be unable to withdraw their funds held in Bitcoin, as the value of cryptocurrencies suffered serious declines. Two hours after that announcement, Bitcoin withdrawals were allowed to resume.

Binance has a strong brand presence in Africa. Binance sponsored the Africa Cup of Nations in 2021. It is also taking crypto education to many countries on the continent.

Binance invested US$500 million towards the acquisition of Twitter by Elon Musk that completed in October 2022. Following the investment, the company announced the creation of a team to work on how blockchain and cryptocurrencies could be helpful to Twitter.

On 8 November 2022, Binance offered to buy rival cryptocurrency exchange FTX's non-US operations (FTX.com) to help cover the latter's liquidity crunch. Binance backed out of the deal the next day citing concerns about FTX's business practices and investigations by US financial regulators.

On November 30, 2022, Binance purchased Sakura Exchange. The acquisition allowed Binance to re-enter the Japanese Crypto market.

Binance coin (BNB) 

The company has launched two cryptocurrencies which it developed itself: Binance Coin (BNB), and BinanceUSD (BUSD). BNB launched July 2017, which started as an Ethereum token and later moved to Binance Smart Chain (BSC), launched September 2020. BSC later merged with the older Binance Chain and was rebranded into BNB chain. BNB Chain operates using "Proof of Staked Authority", a combination of proof of stake and proof of authority. It has 21 approved validators. As of 2021, Binance Coin was the cryptocurrency with the third highest market capitalization. Binance allows its users to pay fees on its exchange with BNB.

BNB Chain supports smart contracts and is compatible with the Ethereum virtual machine (EVM).

There have been multiple criticisms of Binance Smart Chain concerning its level of centralisation, which had led to several exploits on the network.

BUSD

BUSD, or Binance USD, is a US Dollar pegged stablecoin issued by Binance. According to Binance it is backed 1:1 by a reserve of US Dollars and was founded by them in partnership with Paxos who is the issuer of the token. Paxos holds the reserves only partially in cash deposited in their US bank accounts with the other part held in U.S. Treasuries. BUSD is natively issued on the Ethereum blockchain by Paxos. Binance creates Binance-Peg BUSD by locking the natively ERC-20 BUSD in a smart contract on the Ethereum Blockchain and issuing Binance-Peg BUSD equivalent to the amount held in reserve in the smart contract. Binance-Peg BUSD is native to BNB chain.

In January 2023, Bloomberg reported that Binance-Peg BUSD “was often undercollateralized between 2020 and 2021. On three separate occasions, the gap between reserves and supply surpassed $1 billion.” A Binance spokesperson said the “process of maintaining the backing … has not always been flawless” but “has been much improved with enhanced discrepancy checks.” 

BUSD is a widely used stablecoin being, the third largest stablecoin by market capitalisation following Tether (USDT) and USD Coin (USDC).

According to reports, the New York Department of Financial Services issued an order to Paxos to stop minting new BUSD tokens in February 2023.

Legal status

United States 
In 2019, Binance was banned in the United States on regulatory grounds. In response, Binance and other investors opened Binance.US, a separate exchange designed to comply with all applicable US federal laws, which nonetheless is banned in six states: Hawaii, Idaho, Louisiana, New York, Texas, and Vermont. In May 2021, Bloomberg News reported that Binance was under investigation by the United States Department of Justice and Internal Revenue Service for money-laundering and tax evasion. In June 2022, the U.S. Securities and Exchange Commission launched an enquiry into Binance to determine if the company's 2017 ICO of BNB tokens amounted to an illegal sale of a security. In December 2022, Binance's American entity Binance.US will acquire Voyager Digital’s assets in a $1.02 billion deal.

In February 2023, Reuters reported that over the first three months of 2021, Binance transferred over $404 million from a Binance US account at Silvergate Bank to Merit Peak Ltd, a company managed by Zhao. Catherine Coley, then-CEO of Binance US, was quoted in messages to another Binance executive saying “no one mentioned” the “unexpected” transfers. Coley left Binance US shortly thereafter. Reuters said the transfers called into question the purported independence of Binance US from Binance.com. A Binance US spokesperson said the Reuters report used “outdated information” without further elaboration.

United Kingdom 
In January 2021, the UK's Financial Conduct Authority began requiring firms dealing with cryptoassets to register in order to comply with anti-money laundering rules. In June 2021, Binance was ordered by the FCA to stop all regulated activity in the United Kingdom.

Japan 
On June 25, 2021, Japan's Financial Services Agency warned Binance that it was not registered to do business in Japan. This was the second notice Binance received from the FSA. Previously, a similar warning was issued on March 23, 2018.

Italy
In July 2021, Italy's Commissione Nazionale per le Società e la Borsa ordered Binance to be blocked from operating. In May 2022, Binance gained regulatory approval in Italy, allowing the company to provide digital asset services in the country.

France 
In May 2022, Binance gained regulatory approval in France, allowing the company to provide digital asset services in the country. France is the first European country to give Binance regulatory approval.

Germany 
In April 2021, the Federal Financial Supervisory Authority in Germany warned that the company risked fines for not releasing an investor prospectus for the stock tokens it has issued.

Thailand 
Thailand's Securities and Exchange Commission filed a criminal complaint against Binance on July 2, 2021, "for commission of offence under the Emergency Decree on Digital Asset Business B.E. 2561 (2018)". Additionally, Thailand's SEC cited Binance for operating without a license, a violation of Section 26 of the Digital Asset Businesses Emergency Decree.

Canada 
On March 17, 2022, Binance has confirmed in an undertaking to the Ontario Securities Commission that it would stop opening new accounts and halting trading in existing accounts for users in Ontario.

Netherlands
In April 2022, The Dutch central bank announced a €3.3m fine for Binance due to offering services within the Netherlands without being registered in the country. The fine was issued to the company after an official warning was issued to the company during August 2021.

India
In August 2022, India's Enforcement Directorate froze the assets of WazirX, an exchange owned by Binance, as part of a money laundering investigation. Following the event, CEO Zhao claimed that they never owned WazirX or owned any equity in Zanmai Labsthe operating entity of WazirXciting "a few issues" that prevented the completion of the acquisition. The co-founder of WazirX, Nischal Shetty, disputed Zhao's claims asserting that Binance had indeed acquired them.

See also 

 Bitfinex
 Kraken
 Coinbase
 BTCC (company)

Notes

References

External links 
 

Bitcoin exchanges
Digital currency exchanges
Bitcoin companies
Blockchain entities